Frederica von Stade OAL (born June 1, 1945) is a semi-retired American opera singer. Since her Metropolitan Opera debut in 1970, she has performed in operas, musicals, concerts and recitals in venues throughout the world, including La Scala, the Paris Opera, the Vienna State Opera, the Salzburger Festspielhaus, Covent Garden, Glyndebourne and Carnegie Hall. Conductors with whom she has worked include Abbado, Bernstein, Boulez, Giulini, Karajan, Levine, Muti, Ozawa, Sinopoli, Solti and Tilson Thomas. She has also been a prolific and eclectic recording artist, attracting nine Grammy nominations for best classical vocalist, and she has made many appearances on television.

A mezzo-soprano equally at home in lyric music and in coloratura, she has assumed fifty-seven operatic roles on stage and eight more in concert or on disc, progressing from minor parts to romantic leadsboth male and femaleand, latterly, character parts. She is especially associated with the Mozart, Rossini and French repertoires and with contemporary American music, particularly the works of Dominick Argento and Jake Heggie. She has participated in nine world premieres. Among her signature roles are Penelope, Rosina, Angelina, Charlotte, Lucette, Mélisande, Hanna Glawari and Mrs de Rocher, and, in trousers, Cherubino, Hänsel, Chérubin and Octavian.

Since stepping back from full-time performing in 2010, she has become increasingly involved in charitable work, principally in aid of ventures fostering musical education or supporting people enduring homelessness. The institutions that she has served include Oakland's Sophia Project and St Martin de Porres School, both no longer extant, and the People's Choir of Oakland, the Dallas Street Choir and the Young Musicians Choral Orchestra.

Her divorce from her first husband, Peter Elkus, was important in the development of American family case law, establishing the principle that when the marriages of performing artists are dissolved, the courts can attribute an economic value to their celebrity status and treat it as marital property to be shared with their former spouses.

Early life

Childhood

Von Stade is a member of a large, wealthy family long prominent in northeast American high society, with roots in Ireland, the Isle of Man, England, Denmark and Germany; "a horsey... set, with a... background that goes back to Colonial Connecticut. The whole thing—Social Register, polo, yachts, investments, private schools, convents." Her father was Charles Steele von Stade, a banker, polo champion and war hero, and her mother was Sara Worthington Clucas von Stade, a secretary and caterer. 

Von Stade was born in Somerville, New Jersey on June 1, 1945, a premature baby weighing 2½ pounds. Seven weeks earlier, on April 10, 1945, her father was killed in action in Germany in World War II when his jeep ran over a landmine. The many letters that he had written to her mother from Europe later inspired Kim Vaeth and Richard Danielpour to devise the song cycle Elegies for her. She described her feelings about her father in her 2004 song lyric "To my Dad", which was set to music by Jake Heggie and performed by them on his album Flesh & Stone.

Von Stade was named after her maternal grandmother, Frederica ( Bull) Clucas. Her family later came to call her by a nickname, Flicka, Swedish for "little girl", which her father had borrowed from Mary O'Hara's novel My Friend Flicka to bestow upon his favourite polo pony.

On December 6, 1946, von Stade's mother married Lieutenant Colonel (later Brigadier General) Horace William Fuller. Employed as a diplomat by the US State Department, he took von Stade, her brother Charles and her mother with him on assignments in Italy and Greece, but his duties allowed him so little time with his stepdaughter that she scarcely got to know him. Her memories of her childhood in Athens inspired one of the poems in her lyric cycle Paper Wings, which was set to music by Jake Heggie and performed by them on his album The Faces of Love: The Songs of Jake Heggie.

On October 6, 1950, Sara Fuller and her children left Le Havre on the SS America to return to the United States. The Fullers divorced in 1951. Sara von Stade established a new life for herself in Washington, D. C., working for the CIA as a secretary. Von Stade remembers her early self as a "latchkey kid" with a dynamic, clever, humorous, volatile mother whose "problem with booze" did not compromise her passionate attachment to her daughter.

Von Stade began her education at the Stone Ridge School of the Sacred Heart, a college-preparatory school near the Bethesda Naval Hospital., later transferring to the Holy Trinity School, Georgetown, a parochial school founded by Jesuits. When she reached grade 8, her mother relocated to Oldwick, Tewksbury Township, New Jersey, and she spent two years at the nearby Far Hills Country Day School before returning to the care of the nuns of the Convent of the Sacred Heart at their elite boarding college-preparatory school in Noroton.

Each of von Stade's closest relatives had at least some enthusiasm for music. At Yale University, her brother sang in the Whiffenpoof a capella chorus; her mother liked listening to operas on the radio and to popular melodies on her Victrola record player; and her father, admired by his comrades for his attractive singing, was a pianist and organist who had studied at a music college in New York. She herself began singing when she was six or seven, pleased to discover that dressing up and performing for her family helped her to cope with a shyness so extreme that the prospect of going to a party could make her physically ill. 

At Stone Ridge, she sang processional music and Masses under the guidance of Mother Jan McNabb. From the age of fourteen, she began taking Saturday train rides from New Jersey to New York to see the latest musicals on Broadway; she routinely bought standing passes for a matinee and an evening performance on the same day, whiling away the interval between them by loitering outside the Metropole Cafe and eavesdropping on jazz played by Gene Krupa or Dizzy Gillespie. Among the shows that she enjoyed were Peter Pan, The Sound of Music, Camelot and Tovarich, and she went ten times to hear Ethel Merman in Annie Get Your Gun. At school in Far Hills, she herself appeared on stage in productions mounted by a multidisciplinary teacher with a love of music and drama, Betty (Mrs. Harold) Noling.

When she was sixteen, her mother took her to the Salzburg Festival to hear Karl Böhm conducting Elisabeth Schwarzkopf and Christa Ludwig in Der Rosenkavalier. Despite arriving at the Festspielhaus dishevelled and wet after being driven through the rain in a leaking Volkswagen, she was spellbound by what seemed to her the most beautiful thing that she had ever heard, and she still treasures an autograph that she subsequently solicited from Schwarzkopf after glimpsing her through a restaurant window. She was introduced to much more classical music in her senior high school years in Noroton, where she sang choral works by Mozart, Handel, Palestrina, Orlande de Lassus and Josquin des Prez. But neither Richard Strauss nor any of the other composers in the classical pantheon could seduce her away from the kind of music that won her heart in her earliest years. When she entertained her friends and family at one of their gatherings, it was invariably with pop songs or show tunes that she had picked up by ear.

Young adulthood

After graduating, von Stade was given a sum of money by her grandfather, with the advice to spend it on something better than clothes or a car. Her mother suggested using it to finance a gap year in Paris. She combined waitressing, tending bar and working as a part-time nanny to three children with studying piano at the École Mozart, although she was so embarrassed by the youth and skill of her fellow pupils that she did not persist with her lessons for long. She had happier musical experiences hearing Schwarzkopf in recital at the Théâtre des Champs-Élysées and Carmen at the Opéra.

Once back in New York, she worked as a sales assistant in the stationery department of Tiffany's"I was terrible at it, and kept sending out orders to Houston, Wyoming and Sacramento, Nevada"and took secretarial night classes that led to a job at the American Shakespeare Festival in Stratford, Connecticut. But she also began to investigate the possibility of earning money from her voice. Offering herself as a freelance singer for hire, she found employment in cocktail bars where "customers were not expected to listen, and didn't", and she took part in a promotional industrial musical staged for the Winchester Repeating Arms Company. Eventually she summoned up enough courage to begin asking for small parts in summer stock musicals. It was not an easy process for her: "You do fifty or sixty auditions and get called back five times and maybe get one job offerif you're lucky."  But ultimately her persistence was rewarded when she made her professional stage debut in the Long Wharf Theatre, New Haven in 1966, playing Beauty in a children's production of Beauty and the Beast.

Torn between her growing ambition, her difficulty in acknowledging it, her Catholic guilt over it and her fear of failure, she was unsure whether to commit herself to the training that would be necessary if she were to become the professional singer that she increasingly dreamt of being. Ultimately it was a friend's dare that tipped the balance and led to her approaching a conservatory that happened to be close to her East 73rd Street Manhattan apartment, New York's Mannes School of Music. Even then, she was still hesitant, initially limiting herself to a part-time course in sight-reading. It was only at the urging of her instructor that she applied to become a full-time student singer. Hoping that she would at least learn how to play the piano well enough to handle pop tunes at parties, she auditioned with Mignons "Connais tu le pays?", and was accepted into the college's vocal programme. She was funded by help from her family and part-time secretarial work. (While working at the Long Wharf Theatre, she had once put her shorthand and typing skills to good use by spending a day temping as Ethel Merman's PA.) Despite a disappointing evening at a Metropolitan Opera Arabella"Awful, no melody"she chose to make opera her speciality, because it offered the quickest route to a degree. Under the tutelage of Sebastian Engelberg, she discovered talents in herself that she had not anticipated, yet she was still so unsure of herself that she contemplated a switch to nursing. But after Harold Schonberg wrote an appreciative review of her Lazuli in the college's production of Chabrier's L'étoile in The New York Times"This little girl has real personality and an interesting voice. She could go places"she found enough self-confidence to enter the Met's 1969 recruitment competition, encouraged by another dare from a friend who wagered $50 on her. Her singing of Charlotte's letter aria from Massenet's Werther got her through to the semi-finals, and the house's general manager, Rudolf Bing, was so impressed by her in a private audition that he signed her up as a comprimario for the next three seasons.

Career
Apprenticeship

Von Stade made the first of her some 300 Met appearances on January 10, 1970 as one of the Three Boys in Mozart's Die Zauberflöte, singing from a basket dangling vertiginously near the top of the proscenium arch: "We were so scared by the time we got down to the stage that we didn't even know what opera we were in". Her later novice roles were Bersi, Cherubino, Hänsel, Lola, Maddalena, Mercédès, Nicklausse, Preziosilla, Tosca'''s Shepherd, Siébel, Suzuki, Tebaldo, Virginella, a Flowermaiden in Parsifal, an Unborn Child in Die Frau ohne Schatten, Wowkle ("Part of my job was to zip Tebaldi up before her high B-flats"), Flora ("The dress was too long, and I kept tripping over it" and a Stéphano whose swordplay almost cost Franco Corelli a finger.

Her neophyte years at the Met were happy ones: she got on well with the daunting Bing, she was grateful to be coached by Alberta Masiello, Walter Taussig and Jan Behr and she was fond of coworkers like "Rosie, the wardrobe mistress, Jimmy, the make-up artist, Nina, the wig lady from Aberdeen and dear Artie, my buddy on the stage crew, who always told me I looked great." Moreover, the Met was an employer generous enough to allow her to moonlight with other companies. In spring 1971, she gave her first performance with the San Francisco Opera as Sesto in an F. Scott Fitzgerald-inspired production of Mozart's La clemenza di Tito, and in the summer, she took part in two productions in Santa Fe: she was Maria in the posthumous premiere of Villa-Lobos's Yerma, and she sang her first Cherubino in a staging of Mozart's Le nozze di Figaro that was notable as the US debut of Kiri Te Kanawa. According to a historian of the Santa Fe company, "It was two of the newcomers who left the audience dazzled: Frederica von Stade as Cherubino and Kiri Te Kanawa as the Countess. Everyone knew at once that these were brilliant finds. History has confirmed that first impression." The production was the first of several in which they would work together, and also the start of an enduring friendship.

On March 28, 1970, von Stade made her one and only Met appearance as Stéphano in Gounod's Roméo et Juliette as fourth cover for an indisposed Marcia Baldwin. Among the audience was Rolf Liebermann, the director of the State Opera of Hamburg. He enjoyed her performance, and he was impressed by her again when, on another evening at the Met, he heard her as Cherubino on March 11, 1972. About to take charge of the Paris Opera, he was planning to launch his intendancy with a lavishly glamorous production of Figaro at the Royal Opera of Versailles, produced by Giorgio Strehler and conducted by Georg Solti. Would she like to take her Cherubino to France? She consulted with Rudolf Bing's successor, Göran Gentele, who advised her not to renew her contract at the Met but to make the most of what promised to be an extraordinary opportunity: "Zero in on what kind of singer you want to be, and then come back to me".

She gave her final performance as a comprimario on June 23, 1972, singing the role of Preziosilla in, aptly, Verdi's La forza del destino. In the summer of that year, she returned to Santa Fe for her first Zerlina in Mozart's Don Giovanni and her first portrayal of the traumatized heroine of Debussy's Pelléas et Mélisande ("At the point where Pelléas was coming toward me singing 'Je t'aime, je t'aime', I was trying to decide whether to go to a certain pizza parlor after the show").  After recording her first LP in February 1973Joseph Haydn's Harmoniemesse, conducted by Leonard Bernstein she crossed the Atlantic to begin preparations for her Paris Figaro. Both the production and her contribution to it were widely acclaimeda French critic wrote that she had the voice of an angeland she was soon receiving offers from many of the world's greatest opera houses. She made her British theatrical debut on July 1 at Glyndebourne under John Pritchard in another staging of Figaro, singing with her modesty intact despite the wish of her producer, Peter Hall, that she should perform part of the boudoir scene topless. In the autumn, she returned to San Francisco as Dorabella in Mozart's Così fan tutte; and at Christmas, she came back to the Met eighteen months after leaving it, debuting her Rosina in Rossini's Il barbiere di Siviglia as an acknowledged international star. Meeting Marcia Baldwin in later years, she joked that her colleague's night of illness back in 1970 had been singularly serendipitous. "Without you, honey, I would not have had a career."

Baroque opera

Von Stade's first season at Glyndebourne gave her the opportunity to become acquainted with Peter Hall's staging of Monteverdi's Il ritorno d'Ulisse in patria. She attended each of that summer's seventeen performances of the work. She was enthralled by how he had crafted it"I don't think I've ever had an experience before or since that compared to it"and also by Janet Baker's Penelope: "If I could project her quiet dignity and devotion in just one of my performances, I'd rejoice for the rest of my life." She was also delighted by Raymond Leppard's extravagant realization of the piece. While acknowledging that his way with baroque scores had been slighted by some musicologists as anachronistic, she relished the appealing vivacity of the results: "I think he brought them alive and gave them a life that made them intensely popular." It was in Leppard's version of Ulisse that she appeared in her house debut with the Washington Opera (1974) in the piece's first American staging. She was Penelope again in her house debut with the New York City Opera (1976), subsequently stepping into Baker's shoes under Leppard's direction at Glyndebourne in 1979 and reprising the role in San Francisco (1990) andin Glen Wilson's austere editionin Los Angeles (1997). She returned to Monteverdi in the autumn of her career, performing the smaller role of the scorned empress Ottavia in L'incoronazione di Poppea in Houston (2006) and in Los Angeles (2006).

She collaborated with Leppard on an unhappier baroque enterprise in 1980, singing Iphise in a televised, ultra-modernist staging of Rameau's Dardanus in Paris. One of Leppard's books recounts the project's troubles, which included a clowning violist, an incompetent organist. wire-flown singers who squeaked with terror and a producer and designer who abandoned their creation midway through its run. Von Stade thought the staging so inept that after the exit of its authors, she felt obliged to take control of it and try to repair its infelicities herself. Leppard described the experience as the worst of his conducting life, an agonizing episode that left a permanent scar on his psyche.

Handel's Serse was the only other baroque opera in which von Stade appeared, and the only British opera in her entire curriculum vitae. Singing its title role in a staging by Stephen Wadsworth in Santa Fe in 1993 withoutby her own admissionadequate preparation, she suffered a disastrous memory lapse in the opening lines of her first major aria. (Slightly dyslexic, she sometimes finds learning scores difficult.) "I'm here to tell you that you don't actually die from shame", she said to her manager afterwards. "You might like to, you might wish you couldbut you don't." She revisited Serse in her house debut at Seattle Opera when Wadsworth's production was revived there in 1997.

18th-century opera

Mozart is von Stade's favourite composer (and also the historical figure whom she most admires). She thinks that Cherubino in Le nozze di Figaro was to some extent autobiographical: "In many respects he is the spirit of Mozart. That's how I imagine [Mozart] to have acted and looked, from his letters. I think [Cherubino is] very close to his character without the dark side." In particular, she sees the composer and his creation as both "little devils", sharing the "bug-eyed admiration of women" that she remarked in Tom Hulce's portrait of Mozart in the film Amadeus. Her playful, aristocratic interpretation of the adolescent page, informed by her observations of seven teenaged male cousins, was greeted by the eminent record producer Walter LeggeElisabeth Schwarzkopf's husbandas revelatory: "The joy of the evening is Frederica von Stade, an actress of seemingly unlimited resources. I've never seen or heard a better Cherubino." Certainly no role figured in her engagement diary more often. Her early appearances as the farfallone amoroso were followed by others in Houston (1973), Paris (1974, 1980), Salzburg (house debut 1974, 1975, 1976, 1987), Vienna (house debut 1977), Chicago (1987, 1991) and San Francisco (1991), and she incarnated him forty-eight times at the Met between 1972 and 1992.

Mozart's other da Ponte operas were less important in her career. She sang Zerlina with the Met in its spring tour in 1974, and Despina in Così fan tutte in San Francisco (2004) and at the Ravinia Festival (2010). (She admits to not being especially fond of her earlier Così role, Dorabella.) But she was often heard in trouser roles in Mozart's opera serie. Her Sesto in San Francisco's 1971 La clemenza di Tito was followed by further performances at the Teatro Colón in Buenos Aires (1980), Munich (1981), San Francisco (1993) and Dallas (1999), and she recorded the opera's secondary role of Annio for Colin Davis (1976). In 1982, she returned to the Met after a hiatus of six years to star as Idamante in the house's televised company premiere of Idomeneo. a staging that partnered her with Luciano Pavarotti (one of the singers who she most adores). She revisited the piece with other tenors at the Met (1983, 1986, 1989) and, in concert, at Tanglewood (1991).

The seldom performed operas of the 18th century's other great master, Joseph Haydn, were works in which she was never heard theatrically, but she did contribute to the pioneering series of recordings of them conducted by Antal Doráti. She was an uncharacteristically furious Amaranta in La fedeltà premiata (1975), and Lisetta in the astronomical comedy Il mondo della luna (1977).

19th-century Italian opera

Von Stade has often spoken of her special devotion to the Italian operas of the early 1800s. "I love bel canto; it's the core of what singing is about." "I really believe so much in bel canto, and particularly Rossini's music. It does everything that can be accomplished through the voice." "Sometimes what you want to get across is: 'This is hard, but I am fantastic because I can do this.' ... That's what Rossini is".

She is identified with Rosina in Il barbiere di Siviglia almost as closely as with Cherubino, although she has confessed to loving the Rossini role much less than the Mozart one. "I used to be uncomfortable doing Rosina. … She's usually played as the pert soubrette, with sort of a sharp turn. But I found I can do it within my own terms. Rosina can be wilful one moment, but she can be tender the next." She sang the role twenty-two times at the Met between 1973 and 1992, and also at Covent Garden (house debut 1975) and at La Scala (1976, 1984), in San Francisco (1976, 1992), in Hamburg (1979), in Vienna (1987, 1988), and in Chicago (1989,1994). Her first La Scala staging was nearly aborted when its producer, Jean-Pierre Ponnelle, insisted that she sing the cavatina "Una voce poco fà" unembellished. He relented only when the conductor Thomas Schippers called in the musicologists Philip Gossett and Alberto Zedda to persuade him to allow his weeping prima donna the ornaments and cadenza that she had prepared for him.

She finds Rossini's La Cenerentola a more sympathetic work, enjoying his treatment of Cinderella for more than its "vocal fireworks and slapstick comedy". "Warmth is the message here. As the subtitle says, it's 'la bontà in trionfo', the triumph of goodnessnot goody-goody bontà, but bontà in the spiritual sense, … the sense that we can be everything to each other. I do feel it as a religious message. My joy is to have the privilege of expressing it. Cenerentola has a certain quality that all the women I play have, a softness. I guess that's what my definition of femininity isthe Cinderella softness." Her Angelina (Cinderella) was heard in San Francisco (1974), in a televised production in Paris (1977) and in Dallas (1979), and also with the company of La Scala when they visited the United States to celebrate the republic's bicentenary (1976). (The Opéra de Paris invited her to participate in their contribution to the US's bicentennial festivities too, performing as Cherubino; she was the only American so honoured by both institutions.) Her interpretation of the role is preserved in a 1981 film of a production by Jean-Pierre Ponnelle which, she thought, achieved the opera's goal of making you "feel like your whole inside is smiling".Rossini, Gioachino: La Cenerentola, with Francisco Araiza, Claudio Desderi, Margherita Guglielmi, Paolo Montarsolo, Paul Plishka, von Stade, Laura Zannini and the Chorus and Orchestra of La Scala, Milan, conducted by Claudio Abbado and produced by Jean-Pierre Ponnelle, Deutsche Grammophon DVD, B0005769-09, 2005

Comic operas were not the only bel canto works in which she performed. In 1978, she joined José Carreras to record Rossini's little known Otello under Jesús López Cobos. The vocal historian J. B. Steane regarded her interpretation of Desdemona as the "most lovely and suitable of her Rossini singing". "The character's tenderness and the music's lyricism asked for just what she had to give." She was also Elena in Rossini's La donna del lago in the opera's first 20th-century American production in Houston (1981), reprising the role in concert at Carnegie Hall (1982) and theatrically at Covent Garden (1985). In Bellini's operas she was heard only rarely, despite her high estimation of them: "If I were a soprano, I would sing nothing but Bellini. I think Bellini comes closest to everything I believe about the greatness of singing." Her Adalgisa in a Met Norma (1975) had the misfortune to be paired with an incongruously cast Wagnerian in the opera's title role. Damning the production as "a travesty of Bellini's work both musically and dramatically", Donal Henahan of The New York Times wrote that Rita Hunter's "monumental proportions and virtual immobility as an actress" were not mitigated by her shrill top notes, her effortful coloratura in "Casta diva" and her being apparently often out of breath. Von Stade's hopes of revisiting the opera with Shirley Verrett came to nothing,Blyth, Alan: Frederica von Stade; Gramophone, February 1977, p. 1263 but she did get to sing Amina in La Sonnambula in San Francisco (1984) and Dallas (1986), performing in a partly transposed version of the score based on that tailored for Maria Malibran.

19th-century French opera

Von Stade became skilled in French while still at school in Noroton, prescribed fifty or sixty pages of Voltaire or Saint-Exupéry a night by a teacher who banned English speech from her classroom. She finds French music more comfortable to sing than Italian, and she has a high regard for French musical sensibilities: "French music is luscious. … The French have a sense about proportion, and they know what works."

In Berlioz, she was Béatrice in concert performances of Béatrice et Bénédict in Boston (1977) and Carnegie Hall (1977) and in a fully staged production at Tanglewood (1984). In Offenbach, she sang the title role in La Grande-Duchesse de Gérolstein in Los Angeles (2005). In Thomas, she starred in Mignon in Santa Fe (1982) after undertaking the smaller trouser part of Frédéric in the recording of the opera conducted by Antonio de Almeida (1977). But the composer most important in her French operatic repertory was Massenet.

"I didn't like Charlotte in Werther at first", she says. "She seemed cold. I don't think so at all now. … She's seeking freedom of expression. … She's been trained within an inch of her life, trained by the period in which she grew up, by an ill parent. … For Charlotte, responsibility is the message. … Every woman who has a child is never the same, in the most awesome way. It's a privilege, but it's heavy. Since Charlotte has had motherhood passed on to her, she feels it with a certain sense of burden. She's still so young." "It takes courage for her to permit herself to experience the kind of passion she has for Werther." Von Stade sang in her first Werther in Houston (1979), revisiting the opera at Covent Garden (1980), in Vienna (1987) and at the Met (1988). (Excerpts from the Houston production were included in Call Me Flicka, an hour long BBC television profile of von Stade, first aired on January 18, 1980, that followed her over two years in America, France and England. The programme also included sequences of her singing music by Mozart, Rossini, Gershwin, Canteloube, Poulenc and Joni Mitchell.)

Von Stade describes Cendrillon, Massenet's Cinderella opera, as "the musical embodiment of the fairy tale as I remember it as a child. The characters are nicely defined and have great humanity." "Pretty party dresses and ball gowns and glass slippers and long hairoh, it couldn't be more fun." In playing Lucette (Cinderella), she felt obliged to exercise a degree of restraint: "I find that with Massenet so much is stated musically, so much romanticism is there, that if you echo it too much in the musical line, it's like being tickled to death. It's too much." She was first seen in Cendrillon in a televised production in Ottawa (1979), and then in Washington (1979, 1988) and, again televised,  in Brussels (house debut 1982) and in Liège (1982).

20th-century French opera

A lighter hearted sequel to Le nozze di Figaro, Massenet's Chérubin gave von Stade the chance to marry her affection for Cherubino to her Francophilia. She thinks the opera "just adorable. It's a little piece of fluff, one of [Massenet's] most charming works. Cherubino ... is now a young man. A beautiful dancer named L'Ensoleillad comes to town, and Chérubin falls madly in love with her. But she is a courtesan and the mistress of the king, and so Chérubin cannot have her. Meanwhile, there is a soubrette character, sort of like Susanna, ... who is in love with him. ... It's typical Massenet, with lots of big dance numbers, and funny counts and countesses running around. ... It's really such a dear piece." She starred in the opera when it received its US premiere in concert in Carnegie Hall (1984) and again, theatrically, in Santa Fe (1989).

"There were all sorts of people who wanted to talk me out of doing Mélisande", von Stade said in 1976. "They said I was mad to try it. Now that role fits me like a glove: I love it." She sees the heroine of Debussy's Pelléas et Mélisande as anything but the "manipulative femme-fatale" that some commentators judge her to be. "She is young, and she's been abused. ... And that's a very special circumstance ... because that makes kids operate a certain way. ... Her lies are lies of necessity. ... I don't think she has any bad intentions. She's young enough to not see some of the consequences of what she might do. ... People want to impose themselves on her and form her to be what they want her to be, and she is just who she is, which is a young, damaged girl." Her 1972 Santa Fe Pelléas was followed by productions in Geneva (1976), in Paris (1977), at La Scala (1986), in Vienna (1988, 1990), and at Covent Garden (1993). At the Met, she was Mélisande in 1988 and again in 1995, when the house celebrated her quarter century of service to it with a new production of Pelléas by Jonathan Miller.

She has sung the part of the Child in Ravel's L'Enfant et les sortilèges, but only in semi-staged presentations: one in London's Barbican Hall (1991), the other in San Francisco (1999), both presided over by her friend Michael Tilson Thomas. She has, however appeared theatrically in Ravel's other opera, L'heure espagnole, singing the role of Concepción under Seiji Ozawa in Tokyo (2003). In Poulenc's Catholic-themed rarity, Dialogues des Carmélites, she was Sister Blanche de la Force in a single run of performances at the Met (1983).

German-language opera

The first major role in a German opera that von Stade assumed was Hänsel in Humperdinck's Hänsel und Gretel. She played him in eleven child-oriented performances (sung in English) at the Met between 1972 and 1983; that of Christmas 1982 was televised. The rest of her German-language repertoire was drawn from the 20th century.

Octavian in Richard Strauss's Der Rosenkavalier, an opera notably richly orchestrated, was a role that tested her lyric voice to its limits but was also one of her especial favourites. "I love that age in boys," she says. "If they feel good about themselves, it comes out. ... Octavian might be boastful, but it's not offensive. Why shouldn't he be boastful? He moves from palace to beautiful palace, head to toe in silver, coming on in that crash of musiche's just too gorgeous to be true. And he's also full of his own sexual pride and discoverythe whole Mrs Robinson thing. I mean, what a gas! To go through that initiation with such a superb woman, not fumbling around with some kid his own age. He's had the best, and it's been done with taste and finesseand great fun." She first portrayed him in Houston (1975), revisiting him at the Holland Festival (1976), in Hamburg (1979), in Paris (1981), on a Met spring tour (1983) and in San Francisco (1993). Her other Richard Strauss role, the Komponist in Ariadne auf Naxos, she abandoned after concluding from a production in Hamburg (1983) that it called for a voice with more thrust than hers.

The tormented lesbian Countess Martha Geschwitz in Alban Berg's Lulu, essayed by her in San Francisco (1998), was another role that was only peripheral to her career, although her interpretation of it was favourably received by critics. But a venture into the world of operetta was more profitable. She had loved Franz Lehár's Die lustige Witwe ever since one winter in a rural phase of her childhood, when "the fire trucks sprayed water on the ponds to make them smoother for ice skaters. Then the waltz from The Merry Widow was played over loudspeakers, and I skated around in pure bliss." She cites the work as supporting her belief that light music can be as great in its own way as Mozart's in his. "It has some of the most genuine, emotionally honest music ever composed, and some of the orchestrations just break your heart. It's sweet, but it's also real, with an adorable story that can be by turns funny, tender and harsh." She was Hanna Glawari in Paris (1998), at the Teatro Colón (2001) and in San Francisco (2002). And it was waltzing with the Count Danilo Danilovitsch of Plácido Domingowho had first sung with her in a Tosca on a Met visit to Cleveland, Ohio on April 29, 1970that she thought it fitting to bring her thirty years at the Met to a close (2000).

American opera

The opera of her native land was an important component of von Stade's career almost from its beginning. In Houston in 1974, she was the infatuated ingénue Ninasharing the stage with her maternal grandmother in a bit part in the premiere of Thomas Pasatieri's The Seagull. (She is fond of recalling that on opening night, her dressing room was knee deep in roses, all of them for Mrs Clucas.) In Dallas in 1988, she starred as the vulnerable spinster Tina in the televised premiere of Dominick Argento's The Aspern Papers. In San Francisco in 1994, she was the vicious and manipulative Marquise de Merteuil in the televised premiere of Conrad Susa's The Dangerous Liaisons"I thought, who can compete with Glenn Close? So I didn't even try"finally granting the director Frank Corsaro his wish of two decades earlier that she would one day play "a real bitch". In 2014, she starred as the embittered nonagenarian Myrtle Bledsoe in Ricky Ian Gordon's A Coffin in Egypt in its premiere in Houston, reprising the role at Opera Philadelphia (2014) and at the Chicago Opera Theater (2015) and, in concert, in Wynton Marsalis's Jazz at Lincoln Center (2016). And in 2018, she returned to Opera Philadelphia to create the role of Danny, a woman in the early stages of Alzheimer's dementia, in the world premiere of Lembit Beecher's Sky on Swings. The Beecher project was one of her most personal: her aunts Carol and Marjorie had both fallen prey to Alzheimer's, and she hoped that, as well helping its audience to understand the disease better, Beecher's opera would foster empathy for Alzheimer's victims' families. "They're essentially losing someone, only they don't die."

Her work on Dangerous Liaisons in 1994 sparked what turned out to be the most consequential of all her professional relationships. The man whom San Francisco Opera assigned to chauffeur her to promotional interviews was its then head of publicity, Jake Heggie, a 33-year-old aspiring composer. When he introduced her to his settings of three Irish folk-songs"Barb'ry Allen", "He's gone away" and "The leather-winged bat"they struck her as marvellously accomplished, and she immediately set about doing all that she could to advance his career. Eighteen months later, San Francisco Opera commissioned him to work with the writer Terrence McNally on an operatic version of Sister Helen Prejean's then recent Dead Man Walking (1993), a bookalso the basis of a film starring Sean Penn and Susan Sarandon (1995)written in the hope of dissuading its readers from supporting capital punishment.

Heggie wanted von Stade to play his opera's central role, Sister Helen, but she declined it in favour of his second choice, the mezzo-soprano Susan Graham. She was, however, eager to create the role of Mrs Patrick de Rocher, the mother of a man awaiting execution, which Heggie and McNally expanded into "a kind of fulcrum" of the work to take advantage of von Stade's assumption of it. The opera is especially dear to her: she says that there is none that she more enjoys listening to, and she cites McNally as her favourite writer. The piece's implicit condemnation of the United States' retention of the death penalty is a reproof that she wholeheartedly endorses, basing her critique of capital punishment on behaviourism. "If you know nothing but brutality your whole life, it becomes your life. And that is where the mistake is. You can't just remove people, you have to remove what is making them that way, and that's what we're not doing." "Capital punishment is an extreme form of state-sponsored vengeance that only demeans and dehumanizes everyone, and does nothing for the victims' survivors, nothing for society. We're all losers when someone is executed." She was Mrs de Rocher at the world premiere of Dead Man Walking in San Francisco (2000), at the Theater an der Wien in Vienna (2007) and in Houston (2010). (The San Francisco production was the subject of a KQED behind-the-scenes documentary, And then one night: the making of 'Dead Man Walking, which aired on PBS on January 14, 2002.) Heggie wrote roles for her in two more of his operas: she starred as the celebrated actor Madeline Mitchell in Three Decembers (originally titled Last Acts) in Houston (2008), at the University of California, Berkeley (2008) and in Hawaii (house debut 2017), and she was the music teacher and philanthropist Winnie Flato in Great Scott in Dallas (2015) and San Diego (2016).

Musical theatre
 
Von Stade does not regret her decision to pursue a career in opera rather than in musicals: she knows that if she had been a Broadway singer, she would have had to perform daily rather than just two or three times a week, and she is thankful that she was spared the injury to family life that such an onerous routine entails. Nevertheless, she has never lost the love of musical theatre that took root in her as a child, when the brassy sound of a Broadway band could excite her almost to the point of making her pass out. "I wanted Broadway more than anything," she says. "My heart is on Broadway." "My idea of dying and going to heaven is walking in a Broadway theatre and hearing the overture." When the commercial success of Bernstein's operatically cast recording of West Side Story proved that there was a market for musical theatre albums sung by the likes of José Carreras and Kiri Te Kanawa, she was happy to avail herself of the crossover opportunities that Deutsche Grammophon's experiment had opened up for her.

The first came in the summer of 1987, when EMI spent half a million dollars recording John McGlinn's musicologically rigorous version of Jerome Kern's Show Boat.  As a little girl, she had dressed up in her mother's clothes and sat on her mother's piano to sing "Bill", but EMI cast her not as Julie LaVerne but in the dual roles of Magnolia Hawkes and the adult Kim Ravenal. A Granada Television film, The Show Boat Story, documented the making of the album (although it glossed over the project's loss of Willard White, who decided to reject EMI's offer of the role of Joe because of McGlinn's refusal to censor Oscar Hammerstein's use of what is now conventionally known as the N-word). In 1990, von Stade returned to Show Boat in Flicka and Friends: From Rossini to Show Boat, a televised concert staged in New York's Avery Fisher Hall, in which Jerry Hadley and Samuel Ramey joined her in singing excerpts from the work. In the autumn of 1987, she recorded a collection of show numbers and pop songs in Flicka: Another Side of Frederica von Stade; the difficulty that she experienced in adapting her technique to the requirements of pop left her with an abiding respect for the singers into whose territory she had trespassed. In December, she starred in the most nearly complete version of The Sound of Music ever recorded, conducted by Erich Kunzel, after two preparatory concert performances of the piece in Cincinnati. In 1988, she was Hope Harcourt in another John McGlinn recording, a historically scrupulous version of Cole Porter's Anything Goes. Her final collaboration with McGlinn was in 1989, when they taped My Funny Valentine: Frederica von Stade Sings Rodgers and Hart.

In 1992, she was Professor Claire de Loone in a semi-staged production of Bernstein's On the Town in London that was recorded for release on CD, VHS video cassette and Laserdisc. In 1994, she was reunited with Jerry Hadley and Erich Kunzel to record an anthology of show tunes, Puttin' on the Ritz. In 1999, she was Desiree Armfeldt in Stephen Sondheim's A Little Night Music in Houston, performing a specially revised version of the score that reallocated some music from its Greek Chorus to its principals. And in 2014, she was the Old Lady who was easily assimilated in a semi-staged performance of Bernstein's Candide at Tanglewood.

Concert music

Von Stade's concert repertoire included sacred music by J. S. Bach, Handel and Mozart. She sang in Mozart's Requiem under Carlo Maria Giulini (London, 1989), and she took part in the filmed performance of his Great Mass in C minor presided over by Bernstein six months before his death (Waldsassen, 1990). It was Bernstein who introduced her to a very different Christian work, Mahler's Symphony No. 4, as she sat beside him on his piano stool and was treated to a private lesson on the song in which it culminates. The symphony's child's-eye vision of paradise entrances her: "I love this concept of heaven that Mahler giveshaving asparagus, and [Saint] Cecilia, and baking the bread. It meant so much to me. being a Catholic." She sang in the symphony under Pierre Boulez (New York, 1974), Claudio Abbado (Edinburgh, 1976), Seiji Ozawa (Boston, 1983) and André Previn (Tanglewood, 1996). The other work of Mahler's with which she was particularly closely associated was his song cycle Lieder eines fahrenden Gesellen, which she sang under Erich Leinsdorf (New York, 1976) and Ozawa (Boston, 1982).

French music was as prominent in her concert career as in her theatrical work. In Berlioz, she was heard in the orchestral version of his song cycle Les nuits d'été under Ozawa (Boston and New York, 1983) and John Nelson (Tanglewood, 1992), and she was the mezzo-soprano soloist in Roméo et Juliette under James Levine (Ravinia, 1988). In La damnation de Faust, she was Marguerite under Georges Prêtre (La Scala, house debut 1975), Ozawa (Salzburg, 1979, Boston, 1983, New York, 1983 and Tanglewood, 1988) and Georg Solti (New York, 1981), as well as starring in a quasi-operatic staging of the piece produced by Luca Ronconi (La Scala, 1995). In Chausson, she sang in Poème de l'amour et de la mer under Riccardo Muti (New York, 1985, and Philadelphia, 1988.) In Debussy, she was La Damoiselle élue under Ozawa (Boston, 1983). And she sang Ravel's song cycle Shéhérazade under Michael Tilson Thomas (New York, 1975), Ozawa (Boston, 1979), Leonard Slatkin (Washington, 1998) and Hans Graf (Tanglewood, 2005) as well as performing it under Slatkin in her belated, televised debut at the BBC Proms in 2002. (She had been scheduled to star in the festival's Last Night in 2001, but had been thwarted by the grounding of aircraft that followed Al-Qaeda's attack on the United States on September 11.)

She sang in the first performances of several works by contemporary American composers. Together with Thomas Hampson, she starred in the premiere of the version of Bernstein's Arias and Barcarolles orchestrated by Bruce Coughlin (London, 1993). Many of her other premieres were of music that had been composed with her in mind. From Dominick Argento, there was Casa Guidi (Minneapolis, 1983); from Richard Danielpour, Elegies (New York, 1988); from Jake Heggie, "On the road to Christmas" (San Francisco, 1996), I shall not live in vain (State University of New York, Purchase, 1998), Patterns (San Francisco, 1999) and Paper Wings (Louisville, Kentucky, 2000); and from Nathaniel Stookey, Into the Bright Lights (Kitchener, Ontario, 2009), a cycle of three songs setting poems by von Stade herself about singing, aging and her love of her daughters.

Chamber music and art song

The pianist Charles Wadsworth first met von Stade in 1970, when he was recruiting singers for Gian Carlo Menotti's Festival of the Two Worlds in Spoleto, Italy. After auditioning "the usual string of blowzy sopranos with orange hair", he was surprised to be confronted by a figure wearing a hat and gloves who might have just graduated from a prep school, "looking a trifle overly ladylike for one so young. ... I remember thinking that beneath the quiet beauty, one sensed something hidden and exciting. She was like those cool British actresses who suggest a burning intensity under the surface." He duly hired her to sing some Schubert, and in 1974 he invited her and her friend Judith Blegen to sing in Alice Tully Hall as guests of his five-year-old Chamber Music Society of Lincoln Center. Subsequently, the Society chose her as the first singer to be admitted to their membership, and commissioned Christine Berl to compose Dark Summers (1989) for them to perform together. In 1996, Wadsworth invited her to join Lynn Harrell, Itzhak Perlman, Pinchas Zukerman and himself at a concert given in Atlanta as part of the cultural festival associated with the 26th Summer Olympic Games.

Von Stade's career as a high-profile recitalist began as early as February 18, 1970, when she shared a bill at the New York Cultural Center with George Allen Reid, a young operatic bass: a reviewer reported "a slight, pretty young woman with a fine, somewhat light voice", "a sensitive and canny interpreter of songs, using vocal colorations to reflect textual sentiments." She gave her first Carnegie Hall recitalrecorded by Columbia, but never released in a sold out auditorium on March 5, 1976. A critic from The New York Times overlooked her forgetting the words of Charles Ives's "Tom sails away" and collapsing on Michael Tilson Thomas's piano in a fit of embarrassed giggles, but spoke for several of his colleagues when he expressed his puzzled disappointment at the "rather peculiar assortment of songs" that she presented. Such strictures notwithstanding, an unapologetic eclecticism remained the essence of her approach to art song throughout her recital career. Frequently performing in small venues in provincial cities as well as in the grandeur of places like Covent Garden or La Scala, she sang arias and songs by, amongst others, Britten, Canteloube, Debussy, Dowland, Durante, Fauré, Ginastera, Honegger, Liszt, Mahler, Marcello, Mozart, Pizzetti, Poulenc, Puccini, Purcell, Ravel, Respighi, Rossini, Satie, Alessandro Scarlatti, Schönberg, Schubert, Schumann, Richard Strauss and Vivaldi. She was also a zealous evangelist for American composers, including Dominick Argento, Amy Beach, Bernstein, William Bolcom, Aaron Copland, Richard Danielpour, Carol Hall, Richard Hundley, John Musto, Thomas Pasatieri, Ned Rorem, Michael Tilson Thomas, Virgil Thomson and Jake Heggie.Frederica von Stade Recital, with Martin Isepp, Gala CD, GL 339Frederica von Stade: The Complete Columbia Recital Albums, Sony CD, 88875183412, 2016

Special events

There are several connections between von Stade's family and the world of American politics. Her aunt, Dolly von Stade, was a guest at the Kennedys' home in Hyannis Port; her father-in-law, Richard J. Elkus, was a friend and diplomatic envoy of President Richard Nixon; her uncle Frederick H. von Stade was an intimate of President George H. W. Bush; and she herself helped to babysit some of Robert F. Kennedy's children when she was a 10-year-old. When a classical singer was needed for a special occasion in Washington, it was often von Stade who was summoned.

On December 4, 1973, she went to the White House to entertain President Nixon, Romania's President Nicolae Ceausescu and Nixon's personal barber with an excerpt from the beginning of Act 2 of Il barbiere di Siviglia performed with the Washington Opera Society; it was the last such event mounted there before Nixon's resignation. On January 19, 1977, she took part in the televised "New Spirit" gala presented at the Kennedy Center to celebrate the inauguration of President Jimmy Carter, singing "Take care of this house" from Bernstein's 1600 Pennsylvania Avenue under the direction of the composer.The Bernstein Songbook, Sony CD, MK 44760, 1988 On January 19, 1985, she sang "Nobles seigneurs, salut" from Meyerbeer's Les Huguenots at the televised gala preceding the second inauguration of President Ronald Reagan. On December 27, 1985, she performed for Reagan again when she sang Jerome Kern's "Smoke gets in your eyes" and "You are love" in homage to Irene Dunne in the televised gala The Kennedy Center Honors: A Tribute to the Performing Arts. On May 31, 1990, she sang George Gershwin's "Summertime" and numbers from Show Boat in a recital in the East Room of the White House after a banquet that President George H. W. Bush gave in honour of the Soviet Union's President Mikhail Gorbachev. And on March 8, 2009, she joined Bill Cosby, Lauren Bacall, Denyce Graves, President Barack Obama and others in a 77th birthday Kennedy Center tribute to President Kennedy's brother Ted. Reminiscing about her visits to the White House, she said that she had felt equally proud to be invited there whoever was in office, but she singled out Ronald and Nancy Reagan as a First Couple who had treated her with particular kindness.

"I'm all for TV," von Stade says, "I really am. ... It brings opera to many more people than would ever be able to go [and hear a performance in an opera house]." Several of the films and televised operas and concerts in which she starred have been issued on home media, and are listed in the discography below. Some of the remainder have been made accessible in whole or in part online, including a concert with John Williams and the Boston Pops (June 4, 1987): a gala celebrating Leonard Bernstein's 70th birthday (Tanglewood, August 25, 1988); a benefit concert for Polio-Plus (Musikverein, Vienna, September 4, 1988); Great Performers at Avery Fisher Hall: Flicka and Friends: From Rossini to Show Boat (April 18, 1990); a concert in Oslo presented in conjunction with Elie Wiesel's conference on "The Anatomy of Hate" (August 28, 1990); Great Performers at Lincoln Center: A Celebration of the American Musical (Avery Fisher Hall, April 7, 1997); and a Metropolitan Opera gala in honour of Joseph Volpe (May 20, 2006).
                                             
Among other televised events in which von Stade took part, as yet inaccessible online, were Mostly Mozart Festival: An Evening of Mostly Mozart (Avery Fisher Hall, July 13, 1988); Great Performers at Lincoln Center: A Christmas Gala (Avery Fisher Hall, December 19, 1990); the sixteenth gala of the Richard Tucker Music Foundation (Avery Fisher Hall, November 10, 1991); a benefit gala to raise funds for the rebuilding of the Gran Teatre del Liceu, Barcelona, after its destruction by fire on January 31, 1994 (Palau Sant Jordi, March 17, 1994); A Grand Night for Singing: Public Television's Gift to You, a concert of classical and popular music hosted by Tyne Daly (March 9, 1996); the Golden Gate Gala celebrating the reopening of the War Memorial Opera House after repairs necessitated by the 1989 Loma Prieta earthquake (San Francisco, recorded September 5, 1997, aired December 5, 1997); Gershwin at 100, a concert with the San Francisco Symphony Orchestra and Michael Tilson Thomas (Carnegie Hall, September 23, 1998);  the Opening Night of the 33rd Annual Mostly Mozart Festival (Avery Fisher Hall, July 28, 1999); the first concert at Philadelphia's Kimmel Center for the Performing Arts (December 16, 2001); and a concert with John Williams and the Mormon Tabernacle Choir and Orchestra given to celebrate the opening of the 19th Winter Olympic Games in Salt Lake City (February 9, 2002).

In 2019, von Stade joined Kiri Te Kanawa on the jury of the 19th BBC Cardiff Singer of the World competition. At the 57th Primetime Emmy Awards on September 18, 2005, she was herself a contender in "Emmy Idol", a parody of American Idol, which challenged a heterogeneous group of niche celebrities to compete against one another in performances of the title themes from classic television shows. Megan Mullally and Donald Trump championed Green Acres, Kristen Bell Fame, Gary Dourdan and Macy Gray The Jeffersons and von Stade and William Shatner Star Trek. The winners were Mullally and the future US President.

Semi-retirement

In 2010, with the birth of her first grandchild expected in the month in which she would turn sixty-five, von Stade began to step back from performing full-time. "There was a point where all of a sudden I started feeling like I was dressed up in my daughter's prom dress with a big bow on the back. I was getting tired of all the stuff that goes with the business. I always loved singing, but getting there and doing the dress and the hairthat just started to grate on me." "Right now, sitting on a train from the airport, on my way home after days of travel, I haven't even a glimmer of regret." She gave a series of valedictory recitals in venues across the United States, often with Jake Heggie as her pianist and sometimes performing duets with Kiri Te Kanawa or Samuel Ramey. During her years at the Met, she had participated in concerts in honour of Plácido Domingo, Mirella Freni, Nicolai Gedda, Nicolai Ghiaurov, Alfredo Kraus, James Levine, Mrs John Barry Ryan and  Joseph Volpe: her own turn to be lauded by the company came on April 20, when she was the guest of honour at the Metropolitan Opera Guild's 75th annual luncheon in the Grand Ballroom of the Waldorf-Astoria New York. Tributes to her were led by Vladimir Chernov, Marilyn Horne, Evelyn Lear and her first Pelléas, Richard Stilwell. Thomas Hampson paid his compliments in song, serenading her with Mozart's "Voi che sapete", Mahler's "Liebst Du um Schönheit" and Jerome Kern's "All the things you are". On April 22, she was joined by Ramey, Stilwell, Emil Miland and Martin Katz in a final, autobiographically themed recital at Carnegie Hall, singing a duet with her pregnant daughter as one of her encores.

On February 6, 2011, her last appearance as Mrs de Rocher in Dead Man Walking at Houston Grand Opera concluded in a ceremony in which she was made an honorary member of HGO's board and presented with the company's inaugural Silver Rose Award, an allusion to her first appearance as Octavian in Der Rosenkavalier in a Houston production thirty-six years previously. (Costumed in Mrs de Rocher's pathetic dowdiness, she began her speech of thanks by saying that she wished she was wearing another dress.) On December 3, 2011, Cal Performances, San Francisco Performances, the Philharmonia Baroque Orchestra, the San Francisco Opera and the San Francisco Conservatory of Music jointly presented Celebrating Frederica von Stade, a gala at the Herbst Theatre featuring Zheng Cao, Joyce DiDonato, Susan Graham, Jake Heggie, Samuel Ramey, Richard Stilwell, Kiri Te Kanawa and Marilyn Horne, the latter attending courtesy not, as she noted, of the Metropolitan Opera but of Sloan-Kettering and Johns Hopkins. The proceeds of the event were donated to two of the charities with which von Stade was particularly associated.

Personal life
Marriage and children

At Mannes, von Stade met Peter K. Elkus (b. 1939), bass-baritone, photographer and, later, teacher, a son of Richard J. Elkus, chairman of Ampex. Von Stade and Elkus were married in Paris in the spring of 1973. In 1976, they moved from their 23rd-floor West Side apartment overlooking the Lincoln Center and the Hudson River to base themselves in a rented house in Paris, not far from the Bois de Boulogne. Their elder daughter was born in 1977; Jenifer Rebecca Elkus was named after a Carol Hall song that von Stade was recording as her baby began to arrive – "She heard her name and figured she'd better come out". Formerly a middle school counselor, Jenny now practises as a clinical psychologist in Virginia, but is also a singer who can be heard duetting with her mother on von Stade's jazz recording Frederica von Stade sings Brubeck - Across your dreams. Anna Lisa Elkus was born in 1980 (delivered, like her sister, by caesarean section). Von Stade's lyric cycle Paper Wings, sung by her on the CD The Faces of Love: The Songs of Jake Heggie, presents vignettes of Lisa's infancy. Now a manager at a global technology company in California, Lisa was a devotee of dance and pop music as a child and has performed as a singer in a rock 'n' roll band.

Divorce, remarriage and grandchildren
As Jenny approached school age, Elkus and von Stade relocated to a Colonial mini-estate near Glen Head on Long Island, not far from von Stade's paternal grandparents' sprawling mansion in the ultra-exclusive enclave of Old Westbury. Elkus coached his wife until 1985: "It's the same old story," said von Stade. "You can't learn to drive from your husband. A husband-and-wife team is a risky thing, ... We thought we were strong enough to defy it, and we weren't." Von Stade filed for divorce in 1990, instigating a courtroom conflict that earned the couple many column inches in newspapers and a place in legal history.

Von Stade and Elkus agreed to share custody of their children, but they were unable to negotiate a mutually satisfactory division of their wealth. In the year of their wedding, von Stade's income net of expenses had been just $2,250; by the time that their marriage was dissolved, it had swollen to $621,878. While her growing success was obviously founded partly on the innate qualities of her voice, it was equally plainly attributable partly to her artistry and fame, and Elkus thought that these latter intangibles were part of the couple's marital property and, moreover, assets that he had had a hand in creating. After marrying von Stade, he had given up his own work as a singer in order to travel with her, attend her rehearsals and performances, advise and critique her, photograph her for album covers and magazine articles and help her care for their daughters. He believed that his efforts in support of von Stade's career entitled him not just to a share in the couple's current riches but also to a paymentperhaps as high as $1.5 millionanticipating the money that she would make in the coming years from performing and, possibly, from undertaking celebrity endorsements. Arguing that no such endorsements were in prospect, that she had already been successful before her marriage and that Elkus's coaching had sometimes done her voice more harm than good, von Stade's lawyers asked the Supreme Court of New York County to rule that her career and profile belonged to her and her alone. In an order made on September 26, 1990, Walter M. Schackman, J. found in von Stade's favour, noting that Elkus's self sacrifice in supporting her endeavours had been compensated by a "substantial life style" in which he had "reaped the rewards of his association" with her, and that his services to her would be adequately remunerated by his share of the couple's tangible assets (which included a house valued at almost $1 million). But when Elkus's lawyer appealed to the Appellate Division of the Supreme Court of New York, Rosenberger, J. and four of his colleagues took a different view, overturning the trial court's order in a unanimous judgement handed down on July 2, 1991, that effectively made Elkus a shareholder in von Stade's future. In an analysis of the case that questioned whether the Appellate Division's holding was compatible with the Thirteenth Amendment's prohibition of involuntary servitude, Janine R. Menhennet, an attorney practising in California, condemned Rosenberger's decision as an insult to von Stade that had invaded the personal nature of her voice and awarded Elkus a part of her very identity.

On December 30, 1990, von Stade married fellow divorcee Michael G. Gorman, father of three, a San Francisco manufacturer and, later, banker, no musician but rather, in her words, "a normal dude", whom she had met in 1988. Her second marriage earned her another page in the annals of family law when Elkus returned to the courts to try to prevent her from uprooting their daughters from their settled life on Long Island to form a blended family with their stepfather and stepsister. Once again, Elkus lost the first round of his fight but won the second: despite von Stade's assurances that she would address Elkus's concerns for their children's welfare by hiring a housekeeper, curtailing her travelling and supporting him in visiting them, a New York appellate court reversed the holding of a lower court and found that there was "no compelling reason or exceptional circumstances to justify relocation to California".Katz, Sanford. N.: Family Law in America, 2nd edition; Oxford University Press, 2015; pp. 126-127 Ultimately von Stade and Elkus found a way to resolve their difficulties amicably, and Jenny and Lisa joined their mother and stepfamily in a 1910 Tudor Revival house in the middle of Alameda, a home in which Gorman and von Stade lived for almost a decade before moving to a property on the island's southeast waterfront.

Von Stade became a grandmother in June 2010 when Jenny gave birth to the first of her two daughters, Charlotte Frederica. As of March 2019, the Gormans' tally of grandchildren numbered seven.

Faith and philanthropy

Von Stade adopted Roman Catholicism as a child, led to her faith by the influence of her convert maternal grandmother, instructed by the nuns and priests who presided over most of her schooling and attracted by the theatricality of Catholic ritual. She has remained a committed member of her church throughout her life, latterly as a regular worshipper at Alameda's Basilica of St Joseph. It is Catholicism which has provided her with her framework for interpreting the world, reconciled her to her experience of suffering and both inspired and guided her work as an artist and philanthropist. She summed up her credo in 2000: "We are all from God. And since we are from God, there must be ... no obstacle, really, between Him and us. I keep thinking that I have to put away anything that stands in the way of my ... vocation, which is singing and sharing music. ... It's the art form closest to prayer, and therefore to the journey toward God, precisely because it comes from a very deep point inside. Singingboth what we sing and how we sing itshows all the flaws, all the neediness of our humanity. And it can reveal all our best possibilities too."

The charitable endeavours through which she has expressed her Christianity have mainly addressed social issues in the poorer districts of the San Francisco Bay Area. In 1992, she began attending dinners and auctions sponsored by Financial Aid for Catholic Education. It was at one of these that she met Carol Cole and David Barlow, who were setting up a refuge to nurture vulnerable mothers and children in a troubled part of Oakland. Operated in accordance with Rudolf Steiner's doctrine of Anthroposophy, the Sophia Project sheltered dozens of families from 1999 to 2014: von Stade served it as a fundraiser, as a member of its board of directors and occasionally as a gardener. She has spoken warmly of its residents, "women … who have no money or resources. They just keep getting up in the morning with that weight on their heads. I don't know how they do it."

She believes that the fundamental cause of America's social problems is the inadequacy of its education system. In 2007, she began developing, paying for and participating in a music programme at the St Martin de Porres parochial elementary school in Oakland after meeting its president, Sister Barbara Dawson, at one of FACE's events. (Sister Barbara was a member of the same Convent of the Sacred Heart that had provided von Stade with much of her own education.) As well as being taught choral singing by von Stade herself, the children at St Martinresidents of one of Oakland's most disadvantaged neighbourhoodswere offered lessons in dancing, the violin, the guitar and the piano, and were treated to visits by Chanticleer and students from the San Francisco Conservatory performing their staging of Hänsel und Gretel. Von Stade also took a group of 8th-graders to the War Memorial Opera House to be introduced to Don Giovanni. In 2009, five of the school's pupils accompanied her on her journey to Washington to perform at the birthday celebrations of Ted Kennedy, with the expenses of their journey defrayed by the proceeds of benefit concerts that she had organized. When the Bishop of Oakland closed the school in 2017 as part of a diocese-wide rationalization, she described herself as heartbroken.

A secular educational programme that von Stade espoused in parallel with her work at St Martin de Porres has proved more enduring. A project built chiefly by the late soprano Daisy Newmannamed by von Stade as the contemporary whom she most admiresthe Young Musicians Choral Orchestra (formerly known as the Young Musicians Program) was created under the aegis of the University of California, Berkeley. It caters to some seventy children between the ages of ten and eighteen who came from families with an income of less than $25,000 a year. As well as providing them with subsidised tuition in music, it aims to foster their personal development more broadly: its goal is to enable as many of them as possible to proceed either to a music college or a university. "Most of our kids have been homeless," von Stade said in 2018. "You just can't believe their storiesor their lives. Music is a lifeline for them." She helps the YMCO's students by promoting concerts that showcase them, sometimes performing with them herself; on January 31, 2010, for example, listeners to Garrison Keillor's A Prairie Home Companion heard her singing the Flower Duet from Léo Delibes's Lakmé with the YMCO's Nicole Rodriguez. She also devotes a large part of her income to meeting the YMCO's running costs. She is involved, too, with similar enterprises inspired by Venezuela's El Sistema, such as the Longy School of Music's 'Side by Side' orchestra, with which she appeared in Cambridge, Massachusetts on March 20, 2015.

In 2020, inspired by her experience of working with Jonathan Palant's Dallas Street Choir, von Stade launched the People's Choir of Oakland, which aims to do for her neighbourhood what Palant's organization has done for his: to use collaborative music-making to kindle a greater sense of dignity, hope and joy in people enduring homelessness. Headed by the soprano Nicolle Foland, the choir offers its guests a safe place to rehearse and perform for two hours a week with the support of a music director, a pianist and a music therapist.

Forthcoming biography and movie
Von Stade's authorized biography, Flicka by Richard Parlour, is scheduled for publication in the United States and the United Kingdom no later than 2025; a parallel documentary movie, Paper Wings, filmed by Nicolle Foland and Brian Staufenbiel while von Stade was developing her Oakland choir project, entered its post-production phase in late 2022.

Recordings
Von Stade has sung on more than a hundred recordings, including symphonic works, sacred music, operas, musicals, art songs, pop songs, folk songs, jazz and comedy. She has been nominated for a Grammy for best classical vocalist nine times, and her recordings have been honoured with two Grand Prix du Disque awards, the Deutsche Schallplattenpreis, Italy's Premio della Critica Discografica and "Best of the Year" citations in Stereo Review and Opera News. Her personal favourites among her albums are her Arthaus video and Decca audio recordings of Le nozze di Figaro, her EMI Pelléas et Mélisande, her Deutsche Grammophon Mahler Symphony No. 4, her pop album Flicka - Another side of Frederica von Stade and her jazz album Frederica von Stade sings Brubeck - Across your dreams.

All of the von Stade recordings first released on vinyl have now been issued on compact disc as well, but five are difficult to find on CD except in boxed collections. These are Frederica von Stade Live!, available in the 18-CD set Frederica von Stade: The Complete Columbia Recital Albums (Sony, 2016), and Judith Blegen & Frederica von Stade: Songs, Arias & Duets, Frederica von Stade: Song Recital, Frederica von Stade: Italian Opera Arias and the Mahler album Songs of a Wayfarer, Rückert-Lieder and songs from Des Knaben Wunderhorn, available in that same anthology and in the 4-CD set Frederica von Stade: Duets, Arias, Scenes and Songs (Newton Classics, 2012). The two SACDs in the discography are hybrid discs which are compatible with any CD machine. Recordings highlighted in blue are the subject of ancillary articles which deal with their taping, cover art, track listings and release histories and provide summaries of reviews by notable critics including Denis Arnold, Alan Blyth, Edward Greenfield, Richard Freed, George Jellinek, William Mann, Stanley Sadie and J. B. Steane.

Albums of music by a single composer
 Argento: Casa Guidi; conducted by Eiji Oue; recorded May 2001; Reference Recordings.
 Berlioz: La damnation de Faust; conducted by Georg Solti; recorded May 1981; Decca.
 Leonard Bernstein: Arias and barcarolles; conducted by Michael Tilson Thomas; recorded September 1993; DG.
 Leonard Bernstein: The Bernstein songbook; conducted by Leonard Bernstein; FVS's contribution recorded January 1977; Sony.
 Leonard Bernstein: On the Town; conducted by Michael Tilson Thomas; recorded June 1992; DG.
 Chris Brubeck: Convergence; FVS's contribution conducted by Sara Jobin; copyright 2005; CD/SACD; Koch International Classics.
 Canteloube: Chants d'Auvergne, Vol. 1; conducted by Antonio de Almeida; recorded June 1982; Sony.
 Canteloube: Chants d'Auvergne, Vol. 2 & Triptyque; conducted by Antonio de Almeida; recorded July 1985; Sony.
 Danielpour: Elegies & Sonnets to Orpheus; conducted by Roger Nierenberg; recorded September 1998; Sony.
 Debussy: Mélodies; accompanied by Dalton Baldwin; copyright 1980; EMI.
 Debussy: Pelléas et Mélisande; conducted by Herbert von Karajan; recorded December 1978; EMI.
 Debussy: Pelléas et Mélisande; conducted by Claudio Abbado; recorded live, 28 May 1986; Opera D'Oro.
 Dvořák: Dvořák in Prague: A Celebration; conducted by Seiji Ozawa; recorded December 1993; Sony. [Also on DVD]
 De Falla: The Three-Cornered Hat; conducted by André Previn; copyright 1983; Philips.
 Fauré: Mélodies; accompanied by Jean-Philippe Collard; recorded December 1981 and June 1982; EMI.
 Fauré: L'œuvre d'orchestre, Vol. 1; conducted by Michel Plasson; recorded June 1980; EMI.
 Ricky Ian Gordon: A coffin in Egypt; conducted by Timothy Myers; recorded March 2014; Albany Records.
 Joseph Haydn: Harmoniemesse; conducted by Leonard Bernstein; recorded February 1973; issued with Haydn's The Creation as Leonard Bernstein: the royal edition No. 36 of 100; Sony.
 Joseph Haydn: La fedeltà premiata; conducted by Antal Doráti; recorded June 1975; Philips.
 Joseph Haydn: Il mondo della luna; conducted by Antal Doráti; recorded September 1977; Philips.
 Heggie: Dead Man Walking; conducted by Patrick Summers; recorded October 2000; Erato.
 Heggie: Dead Man Walking; conducted by Patrick Summers; recorded January and February 2011; Virgin.
 Heggie: The faces of love, the songs of Jake Heggie; accompanied by Jake Heggie; recorded 1998 and 1999; RCA.
 Heggie: Flesh & stone: songs of Jake Heggie; accompanied by Jake Heggie; copyright 2007; Classical Action.
 Heggie: Great Scott; conducted by Patrick Summers; recorded October and November 2015; Erato.
 Heggie: Passing by: songs by Jake Heggie; accompanied by Jake Heggie; recorded June 2007 and January 2008; Avie.
 Heggie: Three Decembers; conducted by Patrick Summers; recorded March 2008; Albany Records.
 Humperdinck: Hänsel und Gretel; conducted by John Pritchard; recorded June 1978; Sony.
 Kern: Show Boat; conducted by John McGlinn; recorded June - August 1987; EMI.
 Mahler: Songs of a Wayfarer, Rückert-Lieder & Songs from Des Knaben Wunderhorn; conducted by Andrew Davis; recorded December 1978; Sony.
 Mahler: Symphony No. 4; conducted by Claudio Abbado; recorded May 1977; DG.
 Mahler: Symphony No. 4 & Songs of a Wayfarer; conducted by Yoel Levi; recorded July 1998; Telarc.
 Massenet: Cendrillon; conducted by Julius Rudel; recorded June 1978; Sony.
 Massenet: Cendrillon; conducted by Mario Bernardi; recorded live, July 1979; Celestial Audio.
 Massenet: Chérubin; conducted by Henry Lewis; recorded live, February 1984; Voce.
 Massenet: Chérubin; conducted by Pinchas Steinberg; recorded April 1991; RCA.
 Massenet: Werther; conducted by Colin Davis; recorded February 1980; Philips.
 Mendelssohn: A Midsummer Night's Dream; conducted by Eugene Ormandy; recorded April and May 1976; RCA.
 Mendelssohn: A Midsummer Night's Dream; conducted by Seiji Ozawa; recorded October 1992; DG.
 Monteverdi: Il ritorno d'Ulisse in patria; conducted by Raymond Leppard; recorded June 1979; Sony.
 Mozart: La clemenza di Tito; conducted by Colin Davis; recorded July 1976; Philips.
 Mozart: Così fan tutte; conducted by Alain Lombard; recorded May 1977; Erato.
 Mozart: Great Mass in C minor, Ave verum corpus & Exsultate, jubilate; conducted by Leonard Bernstein; recorded April 1990; DG. [Also on DVD]
 Mozart: Mass K. 139, "Waisenhausmesse"; conducted by Claudio Abbado; recorded October 1975; DG.
 Mozart: Le nozze di Figaro; conducted by Herbert von Karajan; recorded live, 1974; Opera D'Oro.
 Mozart: Le nozze di Figaro; conducted by Herbert von Karajan; recorded live, May 1977, Orfeo
 Mozart: Le nozze di Figaro; conducted by Herbert von Karajan; recorded April and May 1978; Decca.
 Mozart: Le nozze di Figaro; conducted by Georg Solti; recorded June and December 1981; Decca.
 Offenbach: Arias and overtures; conducted by Antonio de Almeida; recorded December 1994; RCA.
 Porter: Anything goes; conducted by John McGlinn; recorded August 1988; EMI.
 Rameau: Dardanus; conducted by Raymond Leppard; recorded November 1980; Erato.
 Ravel: Shéhérazade, Chansons madécasses, Mélodies populaires grecques and Mélodies hébraïques; conducted by Seiji Ozawa; recorded October and November 1979 and April 1980; Sony.
 Rodgers: My funny valentine - Frederica von Stade sings Rodgers & Hart; conducted by John McGlinn; recorded September 1989; EMI.
 Rodgers: The Sound of Music; conducted by Erich Kunzel; recorded December 1987; Telarc.
 Rossini: Il barbiere di Siviglia; conducted by Thomas Schippers; recorded live, 31 December 1976; Living Stage.
 Rossini: The Rossini bicentennial birthday gala; conducted by Roger Norrington; recorded February and March 1992; EMI.
 Rossini: La donna del lago; conducted by Claudio Scimone; recorded live, 5 October 1981; Ponto.
 Rossini: Otello; conducted by Jesús López Cobos; recorded September 1978; Philips.
 Richard Strauss: Der Rosenkavalier; conducted by Edo de Waart; recorded July 1976; Philips.
 Richard Strauss: New Year's Eve Concert 1992; conducted by Claudio Abbado; recorded December 1992; Sony. [Also on DVD]
 Thomas: Mignon; conducted by Antonio de Almeida; recorded June and July 1977; Sony.
 Verdi: Don Carlo; conducted by Francesco Molinari-Pradelli; recorded live, 22 April 1972; Foyer.
 Verdi: Don Carlo; conducted by Francesco Molinari-Pradelli; recorded live, 15 June 1972; Living Stage.
 Verdi: La Traviata; conducted by Richard Bonynge; recorded live, 22 October 1970; Bella Voce.
 Wilberg: Requiem  & other choral works; conducted by Craig Jessop; recorded October 2007; Mormon Tabernacle Choir.

Albums of music by more than one composer
 Angel heart, a music storybook; conducted by Michael Morgan, recorded 2011 and 2012; Oxingale Records.
 Ardis Krainik celebration gala; recorded live, 20 October 1998; Lyric Opera of Chicago.
 Judith Blegen & Frederica von Stade: Songs, Arias & Duets; music by Schumann, Chausson, Schubert, Alessandro Scarlatti, Mozart, Saint-Saëns and Brahms, conducted by Charles Wadsworth, recorded November 1974 and January 1975; Sony.
 A Carnegie Hall Christmas Concert; conducted by André Previn; recorded December 1991; Sony. [Also on DVD]
 Dance on a moonbeam, a collection of songs and poems; recorded 1998; Telarc.
 Flicka - another side of Frederica von Stade; music by Richard Rodgers, Mack Gordon, Alan Brandt and Jeremy Lubbock, conducted by Jeremy Lubbock; recorded October 1987; Sony.
 Frederica von Stade: Berlioz - Nuits d'été; Debussy - La damoiselle élue; conducted by Seiji Ozawa, recorded October 1983; Sony.
 Frederica von Stade chante Monteverdi & Cavalli; conducted by Raymond Leppard; recorded July 1984; Erato.
 Frederica von Stade: French opera arias; music by Meyerbeer, Gounod, Berlioz, Massenet, Offenbach and Thomas, conducted by John Pritchard; recorded January 1976; Sony.
 Frederica von Stade: Italian opera arias; music by Monteverdi, Rossini, Paisiello, Broschi and Leoncavallo, conducted by Mario Bernardi; recorded August 1977 and July 1978; Sony.
 Frederica von Stade Live!; music by Vivaldi, Durante, Alessandro Scarlatti, Marcello, Rossini, Ravel, Canteloube, Copland, Hundley, Thomson and Hughes, accompanied by Martin Katz; recorded April 1981; Sony.
 Frederica von Stade sings Brubeck - Across your dreams; copyright 1996; Telarc.
 Frederica von Stade sings Mozart and Rossini; conducted by Edo de Waart; recorded September 1975; CD/SACD; PentaTone Classics.
 Frederica von Stade: Song Recital; music by Dowland, Purcell, Liszt, Debussy, Canteloube and Carol Hall, accompanied by Martin Katz; recorded December 1977; Sony.
 Frederica von Stade: Recital, Edinburgh 1976; songs by Dorumsgaard, Mahler, Ives, Poulenc, Britten, Offenbach and Carol Hall, accompanied by Martin Isepp; recorded live, 31 August 1976; Gala.
 Frederica von Stade: Liederabend, Salzburg 1986; songs by Fauré, Richard Strauss, Mahler, Copland, Ives, Pasatieri, Canteloube, Schonberg, Poulenc and Offenbach, accompanied by Martin Katz; recorded live, 18 August 1986; Orfeo.
 Frederica von Stade: Voyage à Paris; songs by Poulenc, Satie, Debussy, Honegger, Ravel and Messiaen, accompanied by Martin Katz; recorded April 1993; RCA.
 Marilyn Horne: Divas in song - a 60th birthday celebration; accompanied by Martin Katz and others; recorded January 1994; RCA.
 Marilyn Horne & Frederica von Stade: Dvořák, Schumann, Mendelssohn; Lieder and duets; accompanied by Martin Katz; recorded July 1992; RCA.
 James Levine's 25th Anniversary Metropolitan Opera Gala; conducted by James Levine; recorded April 1996; DG. [Also on DVD]
 Opera stars in concert: gala concert for Polio-Plus; conducted by Anton Guadagno; recorded September 1988; Amadeo.
 Puttin' on the Ritz: the great Hollywood musicals; conducted by Erich Kunzel; recorded December 1994; Telarc.
 A salute to American music; the Richard Tucker Music Foundation Gala XVI; conducted by James Conlon; recorded November 1991; RCA.
 Simple gifts; music by Handel, Mozart, Mendelssohn, Gluck, Puccini, Vaughan Williams, Schubert, Canteloube, Copland, Carol Hall and Bernstein, conducted by Joseph Silverstein; recorded November 1991; Decca. (Also issued as A song of thanksgiving).
 Songs of the cat; conducted by Philip Brunelle; copyright 1991; RCA.
 Pauline Viardot and friends; recorded February 2006; Opera Rara.

DVDs
 Dvořák: Dvořák in Prague, a celebration; conducted by Seiji Ozawa; recorded in Smetana Hall in December 1993; Kultur.
 Humperdinck: Hansel and Gretel; sung in English; conducted by Thomas Fulton and produced by Nathaniel Merrill; recorded at the Metropolitan Opera in December 1982; Deutsche Grammophon.
 Mozart: Grosse messe c-moll KV427; conducted by Leonard Bernstein; recorded April 1990; Deutsche Grammophon.
 Mozart: Idomeneo; conducted by James Levine and produced by Jean-Pierre Ponnelle; recorded at the Metropolitan Opera in November 1982; Deutsche Grammophon.
 Mozart: Le nozze di Figaro; conducted by John Pritchard and produced by Peter Hall; recorded at Glyndebourne in 1973; Arthaus Musik.
 Mozart: Le nozze di Figaro; conducted by Georg Solti and produced by Giorgio Strehler; recorded in Paris in 1980; Dreamlife.
 Mozart: Le nozze di Figaro; conducted by James Levine and produced by Jean-Pierre Ponnelle; recorded at the Metropolitan Opera in December 1985; Metropolitan Opera.
 Rossini: La Cenerentola; conducted by Claudio Abbado and produced by Jean-Pierre Ponnelle; filmed in Vienna in 1981; Deutsche Grammophon.
 Richard Strauss: New Year's Eve Concert 1992 - Richard Strauss Gala; conducted by Claudio Abbado; recorded in Berlin in 1992; Kultur.
 A Carnegie Hall Christmas Concert; conducted by André Previn; recorded December 1991; Kultur.
 Christmas with Flicka; conducted by Julius Rudel; filmed in Austria, copyright 1987; Kultur.
 Christmas with the Mormon Tabernacle Choir and Orchestra at Temple Square, also issued as The Wonder of Christmas with the Mormon Tabernacle Choir and Orchestra at Temple Square; conducted by Craig Jessop and Mack Wilberg; recorded December 2003; MTC.
 Glyndebourne Festival Opera: A Gala Evening; conducted by Andrew Davis and Bernard Haitink; recorded 1992; Image Entertainment. 
 The Metropolitan Opera Centennial Gala; conducted by James Levine et al.; recorded October 1983; Deutsche Grammophon.
 The Metropolitan Opera Gala 1991 - 25th Anniversary at Lincoln Center; conducted by James Levine; recorded September 1991; Deutsche Grammophon.
 James Levine's 25th Anniversary Metropolitan Opera Gala; conducted by James Levine; recorded April 1996; Deutsche Grammophon.

Laserdiscs and VHS videocassettes
Leonard Bernstein: On the Town; conducted by Michael Tilson Thomas; recorded June 1992; Deutsche Grammophon; LD and VHS.
Rossini: The Rossini bicentennial birthday gala; recorded February and March 1992; EMI; LD and VHS.I Hear America Singing; starring Thomas Hampson; released in January 1997; Kultur; VHS only.

Writings
Autobiographical essay on Le nozze di Figaro in Hamilton, David (ed.): The Metropolitan Opera Encyclopedia: Thames and Hudson; 1987.
Preface to Bretan, Nicolae: Dalok Ady Endre verseire: Lieder on Poems by Endre Ady; Editio Musica Budapest; 1989.
Recipe for Soupe à Sara in Bond, Jules J. (ed.): The Metropolitan Opera Cookbook; Stewart Tabori & Chang; 1994.
Autobiographical notes for Frederica von Stade: Voyage à Paris; RCA Victor Red Seal CD; 1995
Song: And then the setting sun; music by Jake Heggie; 1996.
Song: The car ride to Christmas; music by Jake Heggie; recorded on December celebration: new carols by seven American composers; Pentatone SACD; 1996.
Song cycle: Paper wings; music by Jake Heggie; recorded on The faces of love: the songs of Jake Heggie; BMG CD; 1997. 
Autobiographical essay in Martin, James (ed.): How can I find God?: the famous and the not-so-famous consider the quintessential question; Liguori; 1997.
Song: Sophie's song; music by Jake Heggie; recorded on The faces of love: the songs of Jake Heggie; BMG CD; 1998.
Autobiographical notes for Frederica von Stade: French opera arias; Sony CD; 1998.
Autobiographical notes for Danielpour: Elegies; Sony CD; 2001.
Autobiographical introduction to Siberell, Anne: Bravo! Brava! A night at the opera; Oxford University Press; 2001.
Song: To my Dad; music by Jake Heggie; recorded on Flesh & Stone: Songs of Jake Heggie; Classical Action CD; 2004.
Song: A hero (Winter roses III); music by Jake Heggie; 2004
Song cycle: Into the bright lights; music by Nathaniel Stookey; AMP; 2009.
Autobiographical essay: Gramophone, May 2010.

Honours
Von Stade was honoured with an award in 1983 at the White House by President Reagan in recognition of her significant contribution to the arts, and by France's second highest honour in the Arts as an officer of the Ordre des Arts et des Lettres. In April 2012, she was elected to the American Academy of Arts and Sciences. She holds honorary doctorates from the universities of Boston and Yale, the Mannes School of Music, the Cleveland Institute of Music, the San Francisco Conservatory of Music and the Georgetown University School of Medicine.

Trivia
In the nineteenth episode of the third season of the CBS cult comedy-drama-fantasy Alaska-set television series Northern Exposure, Wake-Up Call, a beat in which Mary Margaret "Maggie" O'Connell slow-danced with a were-bear in his cave was accompanied by an excerpt from von Stade's Columbia recording of the Baïlèro from Canteloube's Chants d'Auvergne. The track was among those that appeared on the show's original soundtrack album.

References

External links

Official Frederica von Stade web site

Saint Flicka: Frederica Von Stade
Kellow, Brian, Cherubino Grows Up, Opera News, April 1995
Spoto, Donald, Flicka in 3/4 Time, Opera News, March 2000

1945 births
Living people
American operatic mezzo-sopranos
Grammy Award winners
Officiers of the Ordre des Arts et des Lettres
Mannes School of Music alumni
Musicians from Somerville, New Jersey
People from Tewksbury Township, New Jersey
Fellows of the American Academy of Arts and Sciences
United States National Medal of Arts recipients
20th-century American women opera singers
21st-century American women opera singers
Singers from New Jersey
Classical musicians from New Jersey